Leao Butrón Gotuzzo (born 6 March 1977 in Miraflores) is a Peruvian former footballer who last played as a goalkeeper in the Torneo Descentralizado for Alianza Lima. He has made more appearances in the Torneo Descentralizado than any other player - with 643 for Alianza Lima, Sporting Cristal, Alianza Atlético, Melgar and University of San Martín de Porres. He also played 39 times for the Peru national football team.

Honours

Club 
Sporting Cristal
 Torneo Descentralizado (2): 1995, 1996

Alianza Lima
 Torneo Descentralizado (3): 2003, 2004, 2017

Universidad San Martín
 Torneo Descentralizado (3): 2007, 2008, 2010

Country 
Peru national team
 Copa América: Bronze medal 2011

References

External links
 

1977 births
Living people
Footballers from Lima
Peruvian footballers
Peru international footballers
Sporting Cristal footballers
Alianza Atlético footballers
Club Alianza Lima footballers
Club Deportivo Universidad de San Martín de Porres players
FBC Melgar footballers
Peruvian Primera División players
1997 Copa América players
1999 Copa América players
2004 Copa América players
2007 Copa América players
2011 Copa América players
Association football goalkeepers
Peruvian people of Italian descent